The XVI World Rhythmic Gymnastics Championships were held in Brussels, Belgium, on November 20–22, 1992.

Individual

All-Around

Final Rope

Final Hoop

Final Ball

Final Clubs

Group

All-Around

Final 6 ribbons

Final 3 ropes + 3 balls

References
FIG - Event status
FIG - Official results 

RSG - Official results

Rhythmic Gymnastics World Championships
Rhythmic Gymnastics Championships
World Rhythmic Gymnastics Championships
World Rhythmic Championships
World Rhythmic Gymnastics Championships